Charles Stuart (1 February 1907 – 6 April 1970) was an Australian sprinter. He competed in the men's 400 metres at the 1928 Summer Olympics.

References

1907 births
1970 deaths
Athletes (track and field) at the 1928 Summer Olympics
Australian male sprinters
Australian male middle-distance runners
Olympic athletes of Australia
Place of birth missing